A vanishing point is a point on the image plane of a perspective rendering where the two-dimensional perspective projections of mutually parallel lines in three-dimensional space appear to converge.  When the set of parallel lines is perpendicular to a picture plane, the construction is known as one-point perspective, and their vanishing point corresponds to the oculus, or "eye point", from which the image should be viewed for correct perspective geometry. Traditional linear drawings use objects with one to three sets of parallels, defining one to three vanishing points.
Italian humanist polymath and architect Leon Battista Alberti first introduced the concept in his treatise on perspective in art, De pictura, written in 1435.

Vector notation 

The vanishing point may also be referred to as the "direction point", as lines having the same directional vector, say D, will have the same vanishing point.

When the image plane is parallel to two world-coordinate axes, lines parallel to the axis that is cut by this image plane will have images that meet at a single vanishing point. Lines parallel to the other two axes will not form vanishing points as they are parallel to the image plane. This is one-point perspective. Similarly, when the image plane intersects two world-coordinate axes, lines parallel to those planes will meet form two vanishing points in the picture plane. This is called two-point perspective.

Theorem
The vanishing point theorem is the principal theorem in the science of perspective. Some authors have used the phrase, "the image of a line includes its vanishing point". Guidobaldo del Monte gave several verifications, and Humphry Ditton called the result the "main and Great Proposition". Brook Taylor wrote the first book in English on perspective in 1714, which introduced the term "vanishing point" and was the first to fully explain the geometry of multipoint perspective, and historian Kirsti Andersen compiled these observations.

Vanishing line
As a vanishing point originates in a line, so a vanishing line originates in a plane  that is not parallel to the picture .

To put it simply, the vanishing line of some plane, say , is obtained by the intersection of the image plane with another plane, say , parallel to the plane of interest, passing through the camera center. For different sets of lines parallel to this plane , their respective vanishing points will lie on this vanishing line. The horizon line is a theoretical line that represents the eye level of the observer. If the object is below the horizon line, its lines angle up to the horizon line. If the object is above, they slope down.

Properties
1.
Also, consider a line  that lies in the plane , which is defined by the equation .
Using perspective pinhole projections, a point on  projected on the image plane will have coordinates defined as,

When  it stops at the point  on the  axis of the image plane. This is the vanishing point corresponding to all parallel lines with slope  in the plane . All vanishing points associated with different lines with different slopes belonging to plane  will lie on the  axis, which in this case is the horizon line.

2. If we know the coordinates of one of these points, say , and the direction of a straight line on the image plane, which passes through a second point, say , we can compute the coordinates of both  and 

3. The orthocenter of the triangle with vertices in the three vanishing points is the intersection of the optical axis and the image plane.

Curvilinear and reverse perspective
A curvilinear perspective is a drawing with either 4 or 5 vanishing points. In 5-point perspective the vanishing points are mapped into a circle with 4 vanishing points at the cardinal headings N, W, S, E and one at the circle's origin.

A reverse perspective is a drawing with vanishing points that are placed outside the painting with the illusion that they are "in front of" the painting.

Detection

Several methods for vanishing point detection make use of the line segments detected in images. Other techniques involve considering the intensity gradients of the image pixels directly.

There are significantly large numbers of vanishing points present in an image. Therefore, the aim is to detect the vanishing points that correspond to the principal directions of a scene. This is generally achieved in two steps. The first step, called the accumulation step, as the name suggests, clusters the line segments with the assumption that a cluster will have a common vanishing point. The next step finds the principal clusters present in the scene and therefore it is called the search step.

In the accumulation step, the image is mapped onto a bounded space called the accumulator space. The accumulator space is partitioned into units called cells. Barnard assumed this space to be a Gaussian sphere centered on the optical center of the camera as an accumulator space. A line segment on the image corresponds to a great circle on this sphere, and the vanishing point in the image is mapped to a point. The Gaussian sphere has accumulator cells that increase when a great circle passes through them, i.e. in the image a line segment intersects the vanishing point. Several modifications have been made since, but one of the most efficient techniques was using the Hough Transform, mapping the parameters of the line segment to the bounded space. Cascaded Hough Transforms have been applied for multiple vanishing points.

The process of mapping from the image to the bounded spaces causes the loss of the actual distances between line segments and points.

In the search step, the accumulator cell with the maximum number of line segments passing through it is found. This is followed by removal of those line segments, and the search step is repeated until this count goes below a certain threshold. As more computing power is now available, points corresponding to two or three mutually orthogonal directions can be found.

Applications

 Camera calibration: The vanishing points of an image contain important information for camera calibration. Various calibration techniques have been introduced using the properties of vanishing points to find intrinsic and extrinsic calibration parameters.
 3D reconstruction: A man-made environment has two main characteristics – several lines in the scene are parallel, and a number of edges present are orthogonal. Vanishing points aid in comprehending the environment. Using sets of parallel lines in the plane, the orientation of the plane can be calculated using vanishing points. Torre and Coelho performed extensive investigation in the use of vanishing points to implement a full system. With the assumption that the environment consists of objects with only parallel or perpendicular sides, also called Lego-land, using vanishing points constructed in a single image of the scene they recovered the 3D geometry of the scene. Similar ideas are also used in the field of robotics, mainly in navigation and autonomous vehicles, and in areas concerned with object detection.

See also
 Graphical projection

References

External links
Vanishing point detection by three different proposed algorithms
Vanishing point detection for images and videos using open CV
A tutorial covering many examples of linear perspective
Trigonometric Calculation of Vanishing Points Brief explanation of the rationale with an easy example

Perspective projection
Geometry in computer vision